Giancarlo Flati (L'Aquila, May 11, 1953) is an Italian painter, researcher and writer.

Biography 
Flati is born in L'Aquila, in the region of Abruzzo in central Italy. His artistic production began in 1964.

Since 1972 he has been doing artistic and biomedical research in several European Countries (University of L'Aquila, University of Rome "La Sapienza" Rome (Italy), University of Lund (Sweden), Karolinska–Sjukhuset / Karolinska Institutet – Stockholm (Sweden), University of Bergen (Norway), University of Ulm – Marienhospital – Stuttgart (Germany), Gdańsk (Poland), Fords, New Jersey (US). Currently he is active as a painter and writer in L'Aquila, Rome, New Jersey (US).

He has performed exhibitions in several European countries, in cultural institutions, in museums and private art galleries. Private and public collections of his works exist in Italy, Sweden, Norway, Denmark, Germany, Poland, Spain, Australia and US.

He has been working, until 2009, in the field of Microsurgery and General Surgery. Flati has been docent in Scientific Methodology in the University of Rome "La Sapienza". He is author and coauthor of several surgical books and scientific articles, published worldwide in the fields of microsurgery, male infertility, hepato- pancreatic, gastrointestinal and endocrine surgery.

In 2009, after an earthquake struck and destroyed his hometown of L'Aquila, Flati founded the Cultural Association "Cantiere Aquilano di Cultura Creativa ai Margini della Coscienza", which is now active as a "Think tank" group dedicated to creative consciousness, with a particular attention to the aesthetic implications of the holographic paradigm proposed by Itzhak Bentov, David Bohm and Karl H. Pribram.

In 2017, within the artistic movement of “heavenly aesthetics” theorized by Daniele Radini Tedeschi he has been invited at the Triennial Exhibition of Visual Arts in Rome, Complex of Vittoriano, Ala Brasini.
In 2017 he has been invited to participate as a member of “El Circulo Magico” at the National Pavilion of Guatemala - 57.International Art Exhibition - Venice Biennale. On the occasion of the Theme “The Edge” of Guatemala Pavilion Flati has published the book “On the edge of creative mind” (Preface of Daniele Radini Tedeschi) describing the concepts and theoretical foundations of the works exposed: “I the tree of the Edges” and "From the silence of leaves”.

In 2020 he founded a new artistic movement, theorising its foundations in the manifesto "The Tree of the Mabits. Manifesto for a new Artistic and Human Renaissance in the Time of Super Intelligent Clouds", published by Aracne Editrice in 2020.

In 2021 he participated in the Triennial Exhibition of Visual Arts in Rome at the Palazzo Borghese - Galleria del Cembalo.

In the same year he participated in the ARTInGenioMuseum Award Selection in Pisa with the following works exhibited there permanently: 1) Rhythm’s breacktrough 2) Soul theorem. Tribute to Grigory Perelman, 3) Trascendentsd 2.

In 2022 he participated for the second time in the 59th International Art Exhibition - La Biennale di Venezia - Grenada Pavilion, where he exhibited his work Immaginary Hypermask of Mabits 2.

Several art critics and editors have been writing about his art:

Awards 
In 2005, Flati won the Michetti-Museum Prize.

In 2016 won the cover competition for the July/August issue of the magazine Art & Beyond.

Publications 
Flati is the author of the following books:

His works have been published in the following books, reviews and catalogs:

References 

Living people
1953 births
20th-century Italian painters
20th-century Italian male artists
Italian male painters
21st-century Italian painters
Italian male writers
21st-century Italian male artists